Volt Italia is  a progressive and eurofederalist party in Italy. It is an affiliate of Volt Europa and was founded in 2018. Volt was unable to take part in the 2019 European elections, failing to obtain the required 150,000 notarised supporter signatures. Since then, the party has contested municipal and regional elections, winning a number of mandates and providing a deputy mayor since October 2021.

History 
Volt Italy was officially registered as a party in July 2018 as the 5th national offshoot of Volt Europe. The aim was to participate in the 2019 European elections, for which the party collected signatures throughout Italy, but also in other European countries. However, Volt failed to clear the hurdle of collecting 150,000 notarised supporter signatures.

In January 2020, Volt contested its first election in Italy with the regional election in Emilia-Romagna, and failed to enter the regional council with 0.43%.

The party engaged in opposition to the 2020 constitutional referendum to reduce the size of Italy's parliament and senate, which was later approved. In order to be able to achieve the associated threshold, Volt stated that it was open to cooperation with other social and liberal forces.

In March 2021, Volt Italy refused to become part of a new left alliance as part of the call "Now we can go, for a new reformist and liberal-democratic alliance", referring to its special character as a European party. A merger with other parties at the national level would not be compatible with a cross-border understanding of the party as a party that advocates the same contents everywhere, but Volt would continue to be open to cooperation. In addition, Volt criticised that parties should see themselves less as an antipole, but rather see their task as developing and offering solutions to problems.

Also in March 2021, the party launched the campaign "I live, I work, I vote", campaigning for the right of non-EU citizens to vote in local elections, as the current system would exclude a large part of the population from political participation.

The party supports referendums on the legalisation of cannabis and euthanasia to be held in 2022.

Since April 6 2022, Volt Italy has been a member of the European Movement in Italy.

Elections

Regional and local elections 2020 
In the regional elections in Emilia-Romagna, Volt contested an election in Italy for the first time. The content of the campaign focused on health, social justice and economic development. Among the demands during the campaign were the introduction of environmental and social requirements in public tenders and the introduction of consultation tables between schools, universities and companies. The party achieved 0.43% and thus fell short of entering the regional council.

In September, Volt contested the regional elections in Apulia, Tuscany and Veneto, as it did the local elections in Bolzano, Cascina, Mantua, Matera, Senigallia, Trento, Venice and Voghera on joint coalition lists. The party achieved one mandate in Mantua and 4 in Matera.

In May 2022, a councillor in Matera moved to Volt.

Local elections 2021 
In October 2021, Volt contested local elections in Turin, Milan, Trieste, Bologna, Rome, Varese, Isernia, Sesto Fiorentino, Pavullo nel Frignano, Roseto degli Abruzzi and Bettona. The party won 4 seats in Isernia, and one seat each in Rome and Roseto degli Abruzzi. In other cities, seats were won for joint lists, but none for Volt. The party achieved by far its best result in Isernia with 6.58%. The party focused on mobility and the environment, housing policy and young people, as well as entrepreneurship. After the local election, Federica Vinci, Chair of Italy, became deputy mayor of Isernia.

Local elections 2022 
In June 2022, the party took part in the local elections in Monza, Lissone,  Verona, Parma, Messina, Padua, Lissone, Como, Catanzaro, Castiglione delle Stiviere, Lucca, Carrara, Leverano, Marcon, Palermo, Capua and Genoa. Volt won one mandate each in Verona, Genoa, Leverano and Castiglione delle Stiviere. In other cities, joint lists with other parties won seats, but none were won by Volt.

Parliamentary elections 2022 
Volt lost the 2022 Italian general election as part of the centre-left coalition.

External links 

 Website Volt Italia

References 

Italy
Liberal parties in Italy
Pro-European political parties in Italy
Political parties established in 2018
2018 establishments in Italy